The Sussex Ouse Valley Way is a 42–mile long-distance footpath which closely follows the route of the Sussex Ouse. It starts at the Ouse's source in Lower Beeding, West Sussex, when it's still a little stream. It then passes through many villages and towns including Slaugham, Handcross, Staplefield, and Lewes. It terminates at Seaford on the English Channel, where it joins the Vanguard Way.

References

External links

Footpaths in West Sussex
Footpaths in East Sussex
Long-distance footpaths in England